Armenia has a number of archaeological sites.

Armenian archeology 
Armenia is among sites of earliest life. Evidence of prehistoric humankind have been found in caves and open air settlements here. Tools made from flint, obsidian, basalt and other materials from the Stone Age  (1 million 40,000 years ago) indicate that Neanderthal Man made his home in present-day Armenia.

With those tools, he carved the story of his life onto petroglyphs (stone carvings) which can still be found in regions of Armenia and date to the Mesolithic Era, tens of thousands of years before Christ.

Bronze Age in Armenia 
The Armenia of pre-history was an empire unimaginably vast compared to today’s republic. Around the period of the Bronze Age, the Shengavitian culture thrived in a territory of about 1 million kilometers that stretched from today’s Northern Caucasus to Israel and from Central Anatolia to Central Iran.

Early civilization began to emerge from Armenia with the formation of town-like settlements, temples, monumental architecture, a social classes, metal works, systematic transportation, etc. Sculptures of deities reached five meters high by one meter in diameter, and scenes of animal sacrifice, of water birds, snakes and plants from the time were painted onto the surfaces of rocks which became an archeological biography of early Armenia.

Relics dating to the middle Bronze Age (2400-1600 BC) found in Armenia reveal a culture highly developed in jewelry making. Artifacts include colored ceramics, chariots, bronze weapons, gold and silver vessels. Linguists and archeologists say it was this period when the territory was inhabited by Indo-Europeans whose leaders had acquired spiritual and secular power. And during that period the first known statehood formed, administered in Armenian, one of the main branches of Indo-European pre-language.

Iron Age in Armenia  
In the late Bronze Age and the early Iron Age (15-9 centuries BC) several powerful states emerged in the Armenian plateau. The culture is characterized by “cyclopic” castles built of massive stone blocks, which are wall surrounded settlements with surface of up to
100 hectares. Their number reached to 500 and held a culture that developed the early fertility cult, evidenced in monuments of phallic representation. And bronze sculptures of early heroes, and of animals bear striking resemblance to Hittite sculptural art.

From 9-7 BC on the territory of Armenia was established one of the most powerful empires of the ancient world, the Urartian, or Van Kingdom, noted for its canonized architectural principles and proportional systems of separate buildings. The first cities with systematized layouts and landscape terra-forming features started to emerge (Erebuni, Teyshebaini, Tushpa, Argishtikhinili, etc). The arts of jewelry, ceramics, armory forging, stone and bronze sculpture reached utmost development.

Hellenistic culture in Armenia 
The Hellenistic culture (4 BC – 3 AD) heavily influenced portions of Armenia that remain until today. Cities such as Tigranakert, Armavir, Arshamashat, Ervandashat, and Artashat date to that time. (The latter was named by Greek chronologist Plutarch as the "Armenian Carthagena", most probably because the Artashat defense walls and castle towers were built on the advice of the greatest warriors of the ancient world Hannibal).

The Kingdom of Armenia enjoyed its most powerful world influence in the 1st century BC under the reign of Tigran the Great. The wise and powerful leader built a strong state which started to compete in this region with the Roman Empire. But the Romans’ second effort, led by Pompeus, successfully took part of Armenia. But, conceding to the stubborn resistance of the Armenian Highlanders, Rome gave up the notion of making another empire province. Instead, Emperor Neron invited Armenian King Trdat the First to Rome and officially inaugurated him King of Armenia. Armenia kept her independence, but under the patronage of the Roman Empire.

See also 
Prehistoric Armenia
Armenian hypothesis
Prehistory of Anatolia
Prehistoric Georgia

References

External links 
 The earliest finds of cultivated plants in Armenia: evidence from charred remains and crop processing residues in pise´ from the Neolithic settlements of Aratashen and Aknashen

Archaeology of Armenia